= Fabio Madiai =

Italian designer and scenographer (born 1961)

Italian designer and scenographer Fabio Madiai
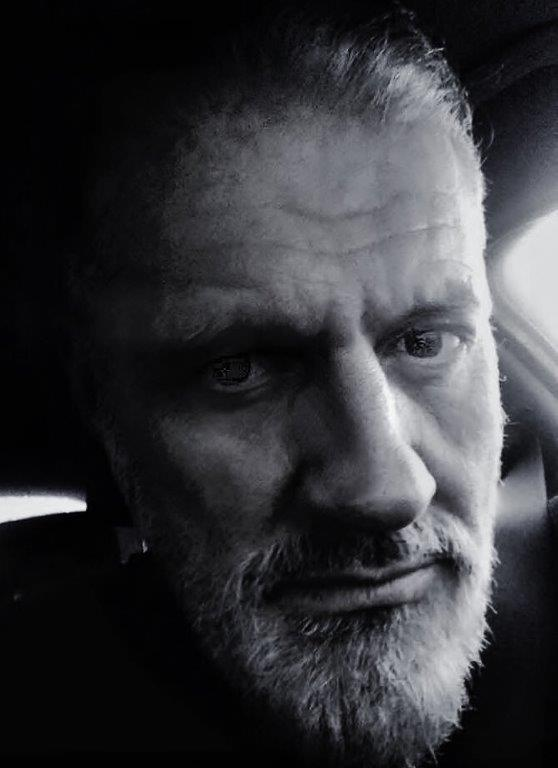
- Born: 13 July 1961 (age 65); Empoli (Tuscany)
- Website: http://www.fabiomadiai.com

Fabio Madiai (born in Empoli, Tuscany on 13 July 1961) is an Italian designer and scenographer. Madiai lives and works in Florence, Italy.

== Projects ==
- 2017 Innovative Fashion Sneaker Project "Q U M A N" (Florence)
- 2017 Wine Shop & Food «QUARTERONI» (Pontepetri PISTOIA)
- 2017 Terrace Lounge – Disco Dinner Club "LA CASCINA" (Montecatini Terme)
- 2016 Dinner - Disco Club "OTEL" (Florence)
- 2016 Disco Dinner Club "TERRAZZA MARTINI" (Florence)
- 2016 Tuscany Restaurant "PANTAREI" (Florence)
- 2016 Panoramic Terrace – Living Club "FLO" (Piazzale Michelangelo)
- 2015 Farm - Club Restaurant "VITIA" (Palo del Colle BARI)
- 2014 Yachting Club – Restaurant – Disco Club "SPORTING CLUB" (Campione)
- 2014 Disco Dinner Club "EDEN CLUB" (GROSSETO)
- 2011 Restaurant Grill – Lounge "QUE' BISCHERI" (Monsummano Terme)
- 2010 Disco Club "BEACH CLUB" (Versilia)
- 2009 Disco Dinner Club LIDO' LE PANTERAIE (Montecatini Terme PISTOIA)
- 2005 Disco Dinner Club "COSTES" (Florence)
- 2005 Disco club "LA BUSSOLA" (Focette Versilia)
- 2004 Restaurant – Beach Disco Club "AQUARAMAMARE" (Versilia)
- 2002 Restaurant - Lounge - Disco Club "AQUARAMA" (Vinci)
- 2001, Restaurant-Lounge Club "LA FORNACE" (Florence)
